Paramartyria immaculatella is a species of moth belonging to the family Micropterigidae. It was described by Syuti Issiki in 1931. It is known from Japan (Honshu, Shikoku and Kyushu).

The wingspan is 9–10 mm, while the length of the forewings is 4.1–4.9 mm for males and 4.3–4.9 mm for females.

References

Micropterigidae
Moths of Japan
Endemic fauna of Japan
Moths described in 1931